The Kuwaiti identity card is issued to Kuwaiti citizens. It can be used as a travel document when visiting countries in the Gulf Cooperation Council.

The Kuwaiti identity card (K-1) is an identity document issued by the Government of Kuwait. It is an official identification card issued by the central authority body and contains personal information, such as name, gender, place of domicile, security issues, and other details which are related to a citizen in his/her natural life. People who are over 18 years of age are eligible to apply for their own K-1 cards. Official Site
Inquiring about Civil ID Status

Kuwait Civil ID is a government-issued identification card. But, to get your Kuwait Civil ID online you must have registered before coming to Kuwait. You can do it at any governmental or authorized authority with your passport copy, details of your visa, and residence permit.

Malta